= Mu'azzama Miroqilova =

Tajikistani pediatrician (born 1934)

Mu'azzama Mirsobitovna Miroqilova (born 9 January 1934) is a Tajikistani pediatrician.

Miroqilova was born into a working-class family in Dushanbe, and graduated from the Ibn Sina State Institute of Medicine of Tajikistan in 1959. Beginning in that year she was a clinical intern, continuing in that role until 1962. The following year she became a lecturer, a post which she held until 1983; meanwhile, in 1980, she joined the Communist Party of the Soviet Union. From 1984 to 1985 she was assistant professor at the Ibn Sina State Institute of Medicine, having become the director of the department of children's diseases there in 1983. In 1986 she received her doctorate in medicine. Her research focus was primarily the correspondence between the blood mixture of children and conditions which can be found in high altitudes; among her publications was The Role of Blood in Normal Situations and the Pathology of Children in Pamir Settlements (Dushanbe, 1977). She also studied the clinical psychiatric care of infected children. Among the awards which Miroqilova received during her career was the title of Distinguished Contributor to Health Services in the Soviet Union. In 2000 she was named an Honored Worker of Tajikistan.
